Kubaneh is a traditional Yemenite Jewish bread that is popular in Israel. Kubaneh is traditionally baked overnight to be served for Shabbat morning accompanied by haminados (eggs that are baked in their shells along with the bread), and resek agvaniyot (grated tomato).

History

A Jewish community existed in Yemen for thousands of years, until the 20th century when pogroms, persecution and discrimination forced the Jewish population to flee Yemen en masse, and to seek refuge in Israel. Only a very small community of Jews remains in Yemen today. Yemenite Jews traditionally made their kubaneh from either sorghum flour or cornmeal during the regular weekdays, but used wheat flour on Sabbath days and holidays. 

Some would add to the dough either sugar, honey or black cumin. Baking was done in a greased pot, tightly sealed, and left to cook overnight. The kubāneh was eaten the following day while it was still hot, and many of the diners have been known to ask for the qaʻeh – the hard and oily lower crust, known for its delicate taste. During the winter months, some were known to insert in the kubāneh the fatty-tail of sheep, or some other piece of meat, which was baked overnight along with the dough, and have thereby turned the kubāneh into an unforgettable delicacy; women after childbirth might be served such a kubāneh.

Overview

Kubaneh is baked by Yemenite Jews overnight and eaten for breakfast or brunch on Shabbat, and has become more broadly popular also. It is prepared baked at a low temperature in a tightly covered container. Ingredients include flour, sugar, salt, and butter (or margarine). Eggs in their shell can be cooked in the dish alongside the bread and served as an accompaniment. The bread is sometimes sprinkled with sugar, served with grated tomatoes, or served with zhug, clarified butter, and hot pepper-garlic chutney.

In popular culture

Kubaneh was featured in the popular Israeli television series, The Beauty and the Baker, as the lead character Amos Dahari, played by Aviv Alush (who himself is of Yemenite and Tunisian Jewish descent) is from a Yemenite Jewish family.

See also
Jachnun
Malawach
Israeli cuisine
Jewish cuisine
Mouna- a similar bread prepared by Algerian Jews
Russian Mennonite zwieback
Monkey bread

References

Shabbat
Israeli cuisine
Mizrahi Jewish cuisine
Jewish breads
Shabbat food
Yemeni cuisine
Yemeni-Jewish culture in Israel